The Timor-Leste women's national football team, represents East Timor in international women's association football and is governed by Federação de Futebol de Timor-Leste (FFTL).

History
In 1985, almost no country in the world had a women's national football team.

In 2005, the country was one of seven teams that included Brunei, Thailand, Indonesia, East Timor, Malaysia, Cambodia, Laos, Vietnam, Burma and Singapore, that were expected to field a women's football team to compete at the Southeast Asian Games in Marikina in December.

In March 2012, the team was not ranked in the world by FIFA.

The FIFA trigramme is TLS.

First participations
The first match ever recorded by Timor-Leste was against Myanmar. The game was held in Mandalay on 27 July 2016 and Timor-Leste lost 0–17.

In 2016, Timor-Leste participated in their first AFF Women's Championship, held in Myanmar between 26 July and 4 August 2016. The squad lost all their matches, being eliminated from the competition.

First international victory

On 15 August 2019, Timor-Leste won their first international match against Singapore with a score of 2–1. Luselia made history as the first player to score a goal for Timor-Leste, she scored against Singapore in the 59th minute which gave Timor-Leste a 1–0 lead over Singapore in the first match of Timor-Leste in the 2019 AFF Women's Championship.

Results and fixtures

2022

2023

Competitive Record

World Cup record

Summer Olympic Games record

AFC Women's Asian Cup record

Asian Games record

AFF Women's Championship record

South East Asian Games record

Head-to-head record

As of 13 July 2022

Players

Current squad
The following 23 players were called up for the 2019 AFF Women's Championship in Thailand.

Caps and goals updated as 21 August 2019 after match against Malaysia.

Head Coach:  Lee Min-young

Previous squads
 2016 AFF Women's Championship squad
 2018 AFF Women's Championship squad
 2019 AFF Women's Championship squad

Player records

Players in bold are still active with Timor-Leste.

Most capped players

Top goalscorers

Current Staff
As of August 2019

Coaching history

Notes

References

Asian women's national association football teams
Women